Meri Bahen (also called My Sister) is a 1944 Hindi language film. It was the fourth highest-grossing Indian film of 1944. Produced by New Theatres, Ltd. Calcutta, and directed by Hemchander Chunder. It starred K. L. Saigal, Sumitra Devi, Akhtar Jehan, Chandrabati Devi, Nawab, and Tulsi Chakraborty. The music direction was by Pankaj Mullick with lyrics by Pandit Bhushan.

The film is cited as Saigal's best film at New Theatres technically. Set against the backdrop of World War II in Calcutta, it was the story of a schoolteacher and his young sister. The film followed his rise to fame as a singer and the changes in his relationships following a bomb-raid.

Cast
 K. L. Saigal as Ramesh
 Sumitra Devi as Krishna
 Devi Mukherjee as Shankar, Ramesh's friend
 Akhtar Jehan as Bimala, Ramesh's sister
 Hiralal as a Naib, Munshi 
 Chandravati as Rekha
 Tulsi Chakraborty as Chaudhary
 Madan Puri as a doctor who treat Bimla in the hospital
 Nawab

Soundtrack
The film had music composed by Pankaj Mullick, assisted by Biran Bal and Hiten Bannerji, with lyrics by Pandit Bhushan. The singers were K. L. Saigal, Pankaj, Rekha Mallick, Vimala, Ila Ghosh, and Utpala Sen. According to Vijay Ranchan, Pankaj had composed two versions of the song "Piya Milan Ko Jana" in Kapal Kundala (1939), directed by Phani Majumdar. Mullick used one version of the song in Meri Bahen in his and Ila Ghosh's voice.

Music
All music was composed by Pankaj Mullick.

References

External links
 

1944 films
1940s Hindi-language films
Indian black-and-white films
Films scored by Pankaj Mullick